The following is a list of notable deaths in July 1995.

Entries for each day are listed alphabetically by surname. A typical entry lists information in the following sequence:
 Name, age, country of citizenship at birth, subsequent country of citizenship (if applicable), reason for notability, cause of death (if known), and reference.

July 1995

1
Paul Nguyễn Văn Bình, 84, Vietnamese prelate of the Catholic Church and first Archbishop of Saigon.
Akanu Ibiam, 88, Nigerian medical missionary and politician.
Wolfman Jack, 57, American disc jockey.
Bruce Mitchell, 86, South African cricket opening batsman.
Nikolay Peyko, 79, Russian composer and educator.
Roger Dale Stafford, 43, American serial killer, execution by lethal injection.

2
Menachem Mendel Futerfas, 87, Russian educator and rabbi.
John C. Higgins, 87, Canadian-American screenwriter.
Gervase Jackson-Stops, 48, British architectural historian and journalist.
Zdeněk Košler, 67, Czech conductor.
Lloyd MacPhail, 75, Canadian politician and 23rd Lieutenant Governor of Prince Edward Island.
Geraint Morgan, 74, British lawyer and politician.
George Seldes, 104, American investigative journalist.
Krissy Taylor, 17, American model, asthma.
Maria Vinogradova, 72, Russian actress.

3
Charley Eckman, 73, American basketball coach and referee, colorectal cancer.
Ricardo Alonso González, 67, American tennis champion, stomach cancer.
Bert Hardy, 82, British photographer.
Alexander Langer, 49, Italian journalist, peace activist, politician, and teacher, suicide.
Eddie Mazur, 65, Canadian ice hockey player.
Gil J Wolman, 65, French artist and member of the Ultra-Lettrist movement.

4
Margaret F. Ackroyd, 87, American civil servant from Providence, Rhode Island.
Andrew John Berger, 79, American ornithologist from the American Museum of Natural History.
Arsen Diklić, 72, Serbian poet, novelist and film director.
Seán Fallon, 57, Irish Fianna Fáil politician.
Eva Gabor, 76, Hungarian-American actress (Green Acres, The Aristocats, The Rescuers) and socialite, pneumonia.
Yevhen Hutsalo, 58, Ukrainian writer and journalist.
Bharat Rangachary, 41, Indian Bollywood film director and producer.
Bob Ross, 52, American television painter (The Joy of Painting), lymphoma.
Gilberto Bosques Saldívar, 102, Mexican diplomat.
Karim Sanjabi, 89, Iranian politician.

5
Bernice Ackerman, 69–70, American meteorologist and first woman weathercaster in the U.S.
Stepan Bakhayev, 73, Soviet Air Force major and flying ace.
Renato Baldini, 73, Italian film actor.
Viktoria Brezhneva, 86, wife of Soviet leader Leonid Brezhnev, diabetes.
Christian Calmes, 81, Luxembourg civil servant, lawyer, and historian.
Johan Koren Christie, 85, Norwegian engineer and air force officer.
John Dittrich, 62, American gridiron football player.
Takeo Fukuda, 90, Japanese politician, 46th Prime Minister of Japan, pulmonary emphysema.
Foster Furcolo, 83, American lawyer, writer, and politician.
Jüri Järvet, 76, Soviet/Estonian actor and theatre director.
Ray Nolting, 81, American gridiron football player and college football coach.

6
Saidye Rosner Bronfman, 98, Canadian philanthropist and matriarch of the Bronfman family.
Philip Clarke, 62, Irish politician, cyclist, and Irish Republican Army member.
Aziz Nesin, 79, Turkish writer, heart attack.
Howard Henry Peckham, 84, American historian.
Eduardo Viso, 75, Spanish football player and football manager.

7
Geoffrey Freeman Allen, 73, British writer on railways.
Jean Bony, 86, French medieval architectural historian.
Martin Bucksbaum, 74, American businessman and shopping center development pioneer.
Marga Höffgen, 74, German contralto.
Helene Johnson, 89, African-American poet during the Harlem Renaissance.
Léon Le Calvez, 86, French bicycle racer.
Eeva-Liisa Manner, 73, Finnish poet and playwright.
Ralph Neves, 78, American jockey.
Thomas Tyra, 62, American composer, arranger, and bandmaster.
Al Unser, 82, American baseball player.

8
Günter Bialas, 87, German composer.
Paul Bonneau, 76, French conductor, composer and arranger.
Edmondo Fabbri, 73, Italian football player and coach.
Jean-Paul Harroy, 86, Belgian colonial civil servant and governor Ruanda-Urundi.
George Johnson, 74, Canadian medical doctor and political reformer.
Pál Kovács, 82, Hungarian athlete and Olympian.
Dorothy Stanley-Turner, 78, English racing driver.
Petrus Josephus Zoetmulder, 89, Dutch missionary and linguist.

9
Dennis Allen, 56, English football player and manager.
Kazimierz Godłowski, 60, Polish archeologist and historian.
Vera Thomas, 73, English table tennis and tennis player.
James Cameron Tudor, 75, Barbadian politician and diplomat.

10
Mehmet Ali Aybar, 86, Turkish politician and Olympian, heart failure.
Reds Bagnell, 66, American football player.
August Belmont IV, 86, American investment banker and thoroughbred racehorse owner.
James Harvey Brown, 89, American politician and judge.
Văn Cao, 71, Vietnamese composer.
Hugh Dundas, 74, British RAF fighter pilot during World War II and television executive .
Barbara Lyon, 63, American singer and actress, cerebral hemorrhage.

11
John Cruickshank, 70, Irish scholar and writer on the French language, literature and culture.
David J. Kennedy, 88, American politician.
Gojko Nikoliš, 83, Yugoslavia/Serbian partisan general, physician, and historian.
Helma Seitz, 82, German actress.
Don Starr, 77, American actor, fall.

12
Lennart Ahlin, 78, Swedish sports shooter.
Michael Clegg, 62, British museum curator, naturalist, and television presenter.
Earl Coleman, 69, American jazz singer.
Ashapoorna Devi, 86, Indian novelist and poet.
Gordon Flemyng, 61, Scottish television and film director.
Erich Kulka, 84, Czech-Israeli writer, historian and journalist.
Sean Mayes, 50, British pianist and writer.
John Yudkin, 84, British physiologist and nutritionist

13
Ali Al-Wardi, 81, Iraqi social scientist.
Aimé Barelli, 78, French jazz trumpeter, vocalist, and band leader.
Varyl Begg, 86, British Royal Navy admiral, Alzheimer's disease.
József Bencsics, 61, Hungarian football player.
Garth Butler, 72, English footballer.
Devyani Chaubal, 52-53, Indian journalist and columnist.
Godtfred Kirk Christiansen, 75, Danish toy manufacturer and managing director of Lego.
Bilge Karasu, 65, Turkish short story writer and novelist.
Peter Morrison, 51, British politician.
Matti Pellonpää, 44, Finnish actor and a musician, heart attack.

14
Elsebeth Brehm, 93, Danish tennis player and Olympic athlete.
Henri Gastaut, 80, French neurologist and epileptologist.
Sergey Shupletsov, 25, Russian freestyle skier and Olympic medalist, traffic collision.
Volodymyr, 69, Ukrainian patriarch of the Eastern Orthodox Church.

15
Bill Amick, 69, American NASCAR driver.
Khalid Bakdash, 82–83, Syrian communist politician.
Delia Bogard, 74, American actress and dancer.
Sylvia Bossu, 33, French conceptual artist, car accident.
Robert-Joseph Coffy, 74, French Roman Catholic cardinal and Archbishop of Marseille.
Ivano Staccioli, 68, Italian film actor.

16
Charles Bruck, 84, French-American conductor and teacher.
Torfi Bryngeirsson, 68, Icelandic athlete who competed in the 1948 and 1952 Summer Olympics.
Gustaf Ekström, 87, Swedish chemist, SS volunteer, and politician.
Mordechai Gur, 65, Israeli military officer and politician, suicide.
Patsy Ruth Miller, 91, American actress, heart attack.
Zenonas Puzinauskas, 75, Lithuanian basketball player.
May Sarton, 83, Belgian-American feminist writer, breast cancer.
Stephen Spender, 86, English poet and writer.
Charles Woodbridge, 93, American missionary, minister, and founding member of the National Association of Evangelicals.
Elvis Álvarez, 30, Colombian flyweight bpxer, homicide.

17
Lionel Billas, 66, French long-distance runner who competed in the marathon at the 1952 Summer Olympics.
Gani Bobi, 51, Albanian philosopher and sociologist from Kosovo.
Harvey Charters, 83, Canadian flatwater canoeist who competed in the 1936 Summer Olympics.
Robert Close, 92, Australian novelist.
Ephraim Evron, 75, Israeli diplomat.
Juan Manuel Fangio, 84, Argentine race car driver.
Harry Guardino, 69, American actor (Dirty Harry, The Enforcer, Pork Chop Hill), lung cancer.
Herb Hippauf, 56, American professional baseball player and scout, cancer.
Rainer Kunad, 58, German conductor and composer.
Michael Ljunggren, 33, Swedish outlaw biker and gangster, murdered.

18
Bernard Bolender, 42, American mass murderer, execution by electrocution.
Fabio Casartelli, 24, Italian cyclist, bicycle crash during the 1995 Tour de France.
Johan Gabriel Oxenstierna, 95, Swedish modern pentathlete and naval officer.
Ryōichi Sasakawa, 96, Japanese suspected war criminal, businessman, politician, and philanthropist.
Subagio Sastrowardoyo, 71, Indonesian poet, short-story writer, essayist and literary critic.
Princess Srinagarindra, The Princess Mother of Thailand, 94, Thai princess, kidney disease.

19
Michael Andrews, 66, British painter.
Balakrishna, 78, Indian actor.
Sydney Lipton, 89, British dance band leader.
Brian Lloyd, 68, English rower and Olympian.
Víctor Manuel Mendoza, 81, Mexican film actor.
Tomás Méndez, 68, Mexican composer and singer of Mexican music and ranchera music.
Kim Pong-ryul, 77, North Korean general of the Korean People's Army.
René Privat, 64, French road bicycle racer.

20
Pierre Barbet, 70, French science fiction writer.
Bernard Callinan, 82, Australian soldier, civil engineer, businessman, and sport administrator.
Cesare Emiliani, 72, Italian-American scientist, geologist, micropaleontologist, and founder of paleoceanography.
Helmut Gernsheim, 82, German photographer, collector and historian.
Ernest Mandel, 72, Belgian Marxian economist and a Trotskyist activist and theorist, heart attack.
Natalia Shpiller, 85, Czech-Russian operatic soprano and a People's Artist of Russia.
Raimundo Tupper, 26, Chilean football player, suicide.

21
Viktor Barannikov, 54, Soviet Interior Minister in 1991 and Russia Minister from 1992 to 1993.
Yves Cros, 71, French athlete and Olympian.
Heinrich Dumoulin, 90, German Jesuit theologian, philosopher and author.
Jon Hinson, 53, American politician.
Sajjad Hussain, 78, Indian film score composer.
Claude McLin, 69, American jazz tenor saxophonist.
Elleston Trevor, 75, British novelist and playwright.
Michael Wisher, 60, English actor (Doctor Who).

22
Tami Ben-Ami, 39–40, Israeli supermodel, cervical cancer.
Jack Bergin, 74, New Zealand neurologist.
Otakar Borůvka, 96, Czech mathematician known for his contribution to graph theory.
Dave Clark, 86, pioneering African-American record promoter.
Daniel Dixon, 2nd Baron Glentoran, 83, Northern Ireland soldier and politician.
Percy Humphrey, 90, American jazz trumpeter and band leader.
Roly Jenkins, 76, English cricketeer.
Harold Larwood, 90, British cricket player.
Shiva Kumar Rai, 76, Indian writer and politician.
Joshua Smith, 90, Australian artist.

23
Ray Beverton, 72, British biologist who made important contributions to fisheries science.
Vernon Cheadle, 85, American botanist, educator and university administrator.
Chuck Hanger, 71, American basketball player.
Mario Passano, 70, Argentine film actor and tango performer, heart attack.
Berta Scharrer, 88, American scientist.
Trần Kim Tuyến, 70, Vietnamese diplomat and Chief of intelligence of South Vietnam.
Kees Verwey, 95, Dutch painter.

24
Sadik Achmet, 48, Greek medical doctor and politician, traffic collision.
Turan Amirsoleimani, 90, Iranian royal.
Martha Boaz, 83, American librarian.
Endre Bán, 61, Hungarian Catholic priest, theologian, and professor.
Judith Dvorkin, 67, American composer and librettist.
Hassan Katsina, 62, Nigerian general and last Governor of Northern Nigeria.
Jerry Lordan, 61, English songwriter, composer and singer, acute renal failure.
Jerzy Toeplitz, 85, Russian film maker.
Hans Wind, 75, Finnish fighter pilot and flying ace during World War II.

25
Janice Elliott, 63, English fiction writer, journalist and children's writer.
Eddie Isbey, 77, New Zealand politician.
Rosalia Maggio, 74, Italian actress, dancer, singer and showgirl, cancer.
Osvaldo Pugliese, 89, Argentine tango musician.
Charlie Rich, 62, American singer, pulmonary embolism.
Hermine Tobolowsky, 74, American Equal Rights Amendment activist.

26
Doris Akers, 72, American gospel music composer, arranger and singer, spinal cord neoplasm.
Laurindo Almeida, 77, Brazilian guitarist and composer in classical, jazz, and Latin music, cancer.
Jaime de Mora y Aragón, 70, Spanish aristocrat and actor.
Gawain Westray Bell, 86, British colonial administrator and Governor of Northern Nigeria.
Sam Benson, 86, Australian politician.
Eleanore Griffin, 91, American screenwriter (Boys Town), Oscar winner (1939).
Heinrich Heesch, 89, German mathematician.
Baruch Korff, 81, Ukrainian-American Orthodox rabbi and American-Jewish community activist.
Pietro Leoni, 86, Mexican Dominican priest.
Boy Lornsen, 72, German sculptor and children's author.
Raymond Mailloux, 77, Canadian politician and Cabinet Minister.
George Rodger, 87, British photojournalist.
George W. Romney, 88, American politician and 43rd Governor of Michigan and father of Mitt Romney, heart attack.
Ismayil Shykhly, 76, Azerbaijani writer.

27
Iza Bieżuńska-Małowist, 78, Polish historian and professor at the University of Warsaw.
Don Carpenter, 64, American novelist and playwright, suicide .
Vladimír Dzurilla, 52, Slovak ice hockey goaltender and Olympian.
Melih Esenbel, 80, Turkish diplomat and Minister of Foreign Affairs.
Rick Ferrell, 89, American Major League Baseball baseball player, coach, and scout.
Miklós Rózsa, 88, Hungarian film composer (Ben-Hur, Spellbound, The Thief of Baghdad), Oscar winner (1946, 1948, 1960).

28
Susie Cooper, 92, British artist.
Douglas Dalton, 82, New Zealand rugby player.
Eddie Hinton, 51, American songwriter and session musician.
Casper Oimoen, 89, American ski jumper.

29
Juozas Bulavas, 86, Lithuanian legal scholar, academic, and politician.
Philippe De Lacy, 78, French-American silent film era child actor, cancer.
Les Elgart, 77, American swing jazz bandleader and trumpeter.
Canray Fontenot, 72, American Creole fiddle player.
Kurt Gudewill, 84, German musicologist.
Leo Kofler, 88, Austrian-German Marxist sociologist.
Miklós Meszéna, 54, Hungarian fencer.
Severino Varela, 81, Uruguayan football player.

30
Nalin Angammana, 49–50, Sri Lanka Army officer, homicide.
Aleksander Bardini, 81, Polish theatre and opera director, actor, and educator.
Pelle Christensen, 72, Norwegian actor and translator.
Nando Cicero, 64, Italian film director, screenwriter and actor.
Charles Dunn, 80, British japanologist from the SOAS University of London.
Alfredo Giannetti, 71, Italian screenwriter and film director.
Anthony Jennings, 50, New Zealand harpsichordist, organist, director, and academic.
Harry L. Shorto, 75, British linguist and leading scholar of  Mon and Khmer languages.
Verner E. Suomi, 79, Finnish-American educator, inventor, and scientist.

31
Joan Embury Cochran, 82, New Zealand social reformer and sex educator.
Bernhard Jope, 81, German Luftwaffe bomber pilot during World War II.
Thomas E. Morgan, 88, American politician.
Genevieve Tobin, 95, American actress.
Lola Todd, 91, American silent film era actress.

References 

1995-07
07